Jalarnavam (pronounced , meaning the ocean) is a ragam in Carnatic music (musical scale of South Indian classical music). It is the 38th Melakarta rāgam in the 72 melakarta rāgam system of Carnatic music.

It is called Jaganmōhanam in Muthuswami Dikshitar school of Carnatic music.

Structure and Lakshana

It is the 2nd rāgam in the 7th chakra Rishi. The mnemonic name is Rishi-Sri. The mnemonic phrase is sa ra ga mi pa dha ni. Its  structure (ascending and descending scale) is as follows (see swaras in Carnatic music for details on below notation and terms):
: 
: 
(the specific notes used in this scale are shuddha rishabham, shuddha gandharam, prati madhyamam, shuddha dhaivatham, kaisiki nishadham)

As it is a melakarta rāgam, by definition it is a sampoorna rāgam (has all seven notes in ascending and descending scale). It is the prati madhyamam equivalent of Ratnangi, which is the 2nd melakarta.

Janya rāgams 
Jalarnavam has a minor janya rāgam (derived scale) associated with it. See List of janya rāgams for full list of rāgams associated with Jalarnavam and other melakarta rāgams.

Compositions
A few compositions set to this scale are:

Kanaka mayura by Koteeswara Iyer
Maheswari kavuma uma by Dr. M. Balamuralikrishna

Related rāgams 
This section covers the theoretical and scientific aspect of this rāgam.

Jalarnavam's notes when shifted using Graha bhedam, yields no other melakarta rāgam, like all 6 rāgams in the Rishi chakra (Salagam, Jhalavarali, Navaneetam, Pavani and Raghupriya being the other 5). Only these rāgams have a gap of 3 notes anywhere in their scale, between G1|to M2. Such a gap does not occur in any other melakarta by definition.

Graha bhedam is the step taken in keeping the relative note frequencies same, while shifting the shadjam to the next note in the rāgam.

Notes

References

Melakarta ragas